Denkmalgeschütztes Objekt is a protected object listed on the Austrian cultural property list as kept by the Federal Monuments Office known as the Bundesdenkmalamt (BDA).

The Austrian directory of "kulturdenkmal" objects is kept in accordance with the Austrian monument protection law of December 2007, which reported over 16,000 listed properties in Austria. The BDA estimates the total inventory to be about 60,000 objects, and the complete monument database was published in 2011. Approximately three-quarters of items in Austria are of a secular nature (castles and palaces, residential buildings, etc.), ten percent are religious buildings (churches), and roughly about one seventh are groups of monuments (museum collections, archaeological sites and finds). In addition to the official list of physical monuments there is also a list of items of interest from the Austrian Dehio Handbook presented by the Department of Inventory and monument research (developed by the BDA).

External Links 

 List of Denkmalgeschütz Objekte from the BDA.

References

 
Austrian culture
Austrian design
Heritage registers in Austria